Octavio Guzmán Sánchez (born November 26, 1990) is a Mexican soccer player who most recently played for Oakland Roots SC in the National Independent Soccer Association.

Career
Guzmán played college soccer for two years at Los Medanos College before transferring to Chico State in 2011 where he graduated in 2013.
He played for CD Aguiluchos USA of the National Premier Soccer League in 2013. He signed his first professional contract with USL Pro club Sacramento Republic in March, 2014.

On November 22, 2016 Saint Louis FC has agreed to a contract with midfielder Octavio Guzman, defender Wesley Charpie, and midfielder Mats Bjurman, pending United Soccer League and United States Soccer Federation approval.

In July 2019, Guzmán joined Oakland Roots.

Honours
Sacramento Republic
 USL Cup: 2014

References

1990 births
Living people
American soccer players
Chico State Wildcats men's soccer players
Sacramento Republic FC players
Saint Louis FC players
Oakland Roots SC players
Association football midfielders
USL Championship players
National Independent Soccer Association players
Footballers from Jalisco
Association football defenders
Mexican footballers